Harry Poulton (May 16, 1919 – October 28, 1981) was a Canadian sprint canoeist. He was born in Saint-Lambert, Quebec and died in Sutton.

Poulton mostly who competed in the late 1940s. He, alongside teammate Douglas Bennett, also from Saint-Lambert,  finished fourth in the C-2 1000 m event at the 1948 Summer Olympics in London. He retired from canoeing in 1949.

References

Harry Poulton's profile at Sports Reference.com
Notice of Harry Poulton's death

1919 births
1981 deaths
Canadian male canoeists
Canoeists at the 1948 Summer Olympics
Olympic canoeists of Canada
People from Saint-Lambert, Quebec
Anglophone Quebec people
Sportspeople from Quebec
20th-century Canadian people